Aureicoccus is a Gram-negative, obligately aerobic and heterotrophic genus of bacteria from the family of Flavobacteriaceae with one known species (Aureicoccus marinus). Aureicoccus marinus has been isolated from seawater from the North Pacific Ocean.

References

Flavobacteria
Bacteria genera
Monotypic bacteria genera
Taxa described in 2013